Pachyanthidium is a genus of bees belonging to the family Megachilidae. The species of this genus are found in Africa and Southern Asia.

Species
Pachyanthidium anoplos 
Pachyanthidium arnoldi 
Pachyanthidium ausense 
Pachyanthidium benguelense 
Pachyanthidium bicolor 
Pachyanthidium bouyssoui 
Pachyanthidium cordatum 
Pachyanthidium cucullatum 
Pachyanthidium himalayense 
Pachyanthidium katangense 
Pachyanthidium lachrymosum 
Pachyanthidium micheneri 
Pachyanthidium nigrum 
Pachyanthidium obscurum 
Pachyanthidium paulinierii 
Pachyanthidium rufescens 
Pachyanthidium salamense 
Pachyanthidium semiluteum

References

Megachilidae